The Canton of La Chapelle-d'Angillon is a canton situated in the Cher département and in the Centre region of France. It was disbanded following the French canton reorganisation which came into effect in March 2015. It consisted of 5 communes, which joined the canton of Aubigny-sur-Nère in 2015. It had 2,573 inhabitants (2012).

Geography
An area of forestry and farming in the valley of the river Sauldre, in the northeastern part of the arrondissement of Vierzon, centred on the town of La Chapelle-d'Angillon. The altitude varies from 137m at Presly to 355m at Ivoy-le-Pré, with an average altitude of 233m.

The canton comprised 5 communes:
La Chapelle-d'Angillon
Ennordres
Ivoy-le-Pré
Méry-ès-Bois
Presly

Population

See also
 Arrondissements of the Cher department
 Cantons of the Cher department
 Communes of the Cher department

References

Former cantons of Cher (department)
2015 disestablishments in France
States and territories disestablished in 2015